Katherine Copsey is an Australian politician who is a member of the Victorian Legislative Council for the Victorian Greens, representing the Southern Metropolitan Region. She was elected in the 2022 Victorian state election.

Prior to entering Parliament, Katherine was a planning and environment lawyer and community organiser.

Systemic responses to address the climate and inequality crises prompted her to run for Parliament. Katherine’s priorities as a Member of Parliament are climate action, no new coal and gas and a swift and just transition to renewables.

She also wants to see more affordable housing and better rights for renters so everyone in the Southern Metropolitan Region has a stable and comfortable place to call home, and strengthen our democracy through integrity reforms.

References

Australian Greens members of the Parliament of Victoria
Members of the Victorian Legislative Council
Women members of the Victorian Legislative Council
Year of birth missing (living people)
Living people